Hot Shit is the fifth studio album by indie rock band Quasi. It was released in 2003 on Touch and Go Records. Early copies as well as the European edition released by Domino Recording Company include a bonus CD entitled Live Shit.

Track listing
All tracks by Sam Coomes except "Sunshine Sounds" and "White Devil's Dream," written by Janet Weiss and Coomes.

"Live Shit" bonus CD
This CD was included in early copies of the American Touch and Go Records release as well as (so far) all copies of the European Domino Recording Company release.

Personnel
Sam Coomes – vocals, guitars, keyboards
Janet Weiss – vocals, drums 
Quasi - production
Strings on "Drunken Tears," "Good Times," and "Lullaby Pt. 2." by:
Brent Arnold – cello, string arrangements
Ollie Glatzen – viola
Roger Seibel - mastering

References

2003 albums
Domino Recording Company albums
Quasi albums
Touch and Go Records albums